Project Republic of Sardinia (ProgReS) is a separatist political party in Sardinia, founded in January 2011 following a split from Independence Republic of Sardinia (iRS).

The party's current secretary is Luigi Todde, while Adriano Sollai serve as its presidents.

History

In January 2011, after a struggle with Gavino Sale, president of iRS, the faction led by former leader Ornella Demuru, including iRS founding members Frantziscu Sanna and Franciscu Sedda, decided to leave the party and launch a "Republican Constituent Assembly" (Sa Costituente Repubricana). In February the new party took the name of Project Republic of Sardinia (ProgReS) and Bobore Bussa was elected as provisional leader.

The party made its first electoral appearance in May 2011 at the municipal elections in Cagliari and Olbia by filing candidates for mayor (Demuru in Cagliari and Gianmaria Bellu in Olbia) and for the city councils. In both cases ProgReS mayoral candidates took less than 1% of the vote. However, the results were welcomed as encouraging, considering the paucity of resources available, as well as the fact the party was new and had yet to make a name for itself.

At the party's first congress in August 2011, Bussa was replaced as secretary by Salvatore Acampora, while Omar Onnis was elected president.

In July 2012 Demuru and Sedda left the party over disagreements with the new leadership and the rise of Michela Murgia, a well-known writer. A year later Sedda went on to launch the Party of Sardinians (PdS) along with Paolo Maninchedda, a splinter from the Sardinian Action Party (PSd'Az).

The party's second congress took place in Cagliari in December 2012. Party members were presented with two proposals: one that saw candidates for the main party roles led by Contu; an alternative proposal whereby each coordinator of the nine regional constituencies would have taken the role of party leader for a limited period time, thus creating a turning leadership. The team led by Contu won and the proposal of a turning leadership was rejected. The congress also accepted a proposal to appoint two party presidents, female and male. Sandro Ghiani and Federica Serra were elected presidents.

In August 2013 Murgia announced she was running for President of Sardinia in the 2014 regional election for ProgRes. 
In November 2013, during a national assembly of the party, Paolo Piras, formerly responsible for communication in the Franco Contu secretariat, was elected secretary to replace the resigned Contu who for work reasons moved to Italy. In the forthcoming election Murgia 10.3% of the vote, but ProgReS, which suffered the competition of two coalition partners, gained 2.8% and failed to pass the 5% threshold for parties outside big coalitions. The other two ProgReS' emanations won 2.2% and 1.8% of the vote, respectively.

In May 2014, during the party's fourth congress, Gianluca Collu was elected secretary, while Carla Carcangiu and Sebastian Madau presidents. In May 2015, during the party's fifth congress, Gianluca Collu, Carla Carcangiu and Sebastian Madau  were confirmed in their roles.

In the 2019 regional election ProgReS formed a joint list with Unidos, a centre-right separatist party, and minor groups. Unidos' leader, Mauro Pili, ran as the list's candidate for President, winning 2.3% of the vote. The list obtained 2.1% and no seats in the Regional Council.

In December 2020, during the party's sixth congress, Luigi Todde was elected secretary, while Adriano Sollai president.

Organisation
The party is organized in territorial activity centers (in sardinian: "TzdA - Tzentros de Atividade") and the Sardinian diaspora in Europe and in the world is represented by the "TzdA Disterru". ProgReS is the second party, after iRS, to organize and involve the Sardinian diaspora in regional politics. 
All Party activists are members of the highest political and decision-making assembly: the National Assembly of activists.

Electoral results

Leadership
Secretary: Bobore Bussa (2011), Salvatore Acampora (2011–2012), Franco Contu (2012–2013), Paolo Piras (2013–2014), Gianluca Collu (2014–2019), Luigi Todde (2019–present)
President: Omar Onnis (2011–2012), Federica Serra and Sandro Ghiani (2012–2014), Carla Carcangiu and Sebastian Madau 2014- 2019), Adriano Sollai (2019–present)

External links
Official website

References

Political parties in Sardinia
Sardinian nationalist parties
Political parties established in 2011
2011 establishments in Italy